Upland is an unincorporated community in Dickinson County, Kansas, United States.

History
Upland had a post office from 1898 until 1906.

It once was the home of the Upland Mutual Insurance Company.

Education
The community is served by Chapman USD 473 public school district.

References

Further reading

External links
 Dickinson County maps: Current, Historic, KDOT

Unincorporated communities in Dickinson County, Kansas
Unincorporated communities in Kansas